Podcasts are downloadable recorded audio (radio) programs (audio logs) that one can listen to.

Podcast or variation, may also refer to:

 "Podcast", a fictional character from the film Ghostbusters: Afterlife
 Podcasts (app), Apple software for playing and streaming audio programming

See also